The 2008–09 Washington Huskies men's basketball team represented the University of Washington in the 2008–09 college basketball season.  This was head coach Lorenzo Romar's 7th season at Washington. The Huskies played their home games at Bank of America Arena and are members of the Pacific-10 Conference. They finished the season 26–9, 14–4 in Pac-10 play and they captured the Pac–10 regular season title and an at-large bid to the 2009 NCAA Division I men's basketball tournament. They earned a 4 seed in the West Region which they defeated Mississippi State in the first round before losing to Purdue in the second round.

2008–09 Team

Roster
Source

Coaching staff

2008–09 Schedule and results

|-
!colspan=12 style=|Exhibition

|-
!colspan=12 style=|Non-conference regular season

|-
!colspan=12 style=|PAC-10 Regular Season

|-
!colspan=12 style=|PAC-10 Tournament 

|-
!colspan=12 style=|NCAA Tournament

Rankings

References

Washington
Washington Huskies men's basketball seasons
Washington
Washington
Washington